was an ancient province of Japan, in the area of Hizen and Higo provinces.  The ambit of this ancient entity is within Nagasaki, Saga and Kumamoto prefectures. It was sometimes called .

Notes

References
 Asiatic Society of Japan. (1874). Transactions of the Asiatic Society of Japan. Yokohama: The Society. OCLC 1514456 
 Nussbaum, Louis-Frédéric and Käthe Roth. (2005).  Japan encyclopedia. Cambridge: Harvard University Press. ;  OCLC 58053128

Kuni no miyatsuko